The Loners Motorcycle Club (LMC) is an international outlaw motorcycle club founded in Woodbridge, Ontario, Canada in 1979. It has Sixteen chapters in Canada, ten chapters in Italy, nine in the United States and several chapters in other countries across the world. The club was established by two prominent Italian-Canadian bikers, Frank Lenti and Gennaro Raso.

The Loners Motorcycle Club states that it is a group of motorcycle enthusiasts that are not involved in organized crime, any members that choose to commit these acts do so without the permission of the club.

Early History
The Loners Motorcycle Club was founded in 1979 by Gennaro "Jimmy" Raso and Frank "Cisco" Lenti. The founders of the club both Lenti and Raso first joined the Satan's Choice Motorcycle Club in the 1970s, however their chapter was among those that were later "Patched-Over" to the Outlaws Motorcycle Club in 1977. They both left and we're involved in starting a chapter of the Rebels Motorcycle Club in Toronto, but then decided to form the Loners Motorcycle Club in 1979. Lenti designed the "rather elaborate and bizarre" patch for his club featuring a half-werewolf, half-horned skull creature.

In 1981, Lenti was kicked out of the club for a period, it was alleged that Lenti had stolen from the club, and was caught, at which point he decided to flee the country to Italy. Where he lived for the next two years.With Gennaro Raso blessing, Lenti officially rejoined the Loners Motorcycle Club upon his return to Canada in 1983. When Lenti was removed from the club he travelled to Italy, he continued to use the Loners name despite his removal from the club in 1981, while in Italy he persuaded other motorcycle clubs to join the Loners, he also opened several new chapters. These chapters were not associated with the Official Loners MC until Lenti's return to the club in 1984 when all new chapters were officially recognized. He set up a chapter in York Region, recruiting mainly from his fellow Italian-Canadians as the group normally did.  A disproportionate number of the Loners were Italian-Canadians from middle-class families who saw themselves as being more polished and sophisticated than other outlaw bikers.

At some point during the 1980s the Loners established a chapter in Saskatoon, Saskatchewan, however it would "Patch-Over" to the Alberta-based Rebels MC, this was seen as very ironic due to the fact that both founders of the club had started a Toronto chapter of the Rebels only to leave it and start the Loners, now they had had one of their chapters patched over by the very club they left.

The Loners International President, Jimmy Raso would also eventually begin expand overseas, establishing chapters in the United States as well as additional countries in Europe. With his first European chapter opening on 24 December 1985. By the 1990s, the Loners had chapters in Woodbridge, Toronto, Vaughan, Richmond Hill, Windsor, London, Amherstburg, Lindsay and Chatham-Kent(which became the London chapter in 1990s). Unusually for a Canadian outlaw biker club by the mid-1980s, the Loners had chapters abroad with one in Portugal and several in Italy, having chapters in Naples, Messina, Salerno, Reggio Calabria, Brolo, Avellino and Isernia.
The Loners were a successful club under Raso and Lenti's leadership despite the way that other clubs predictably mocked the Loners as "the Losers". By the late 1980s, the Loners were the third largest motorcycle club in Ontario, being exceeded only by the Outlaws and Satan's Choice. Langton wrote that Lenti was also personally successful in two "industries bikers tend to admire-a stripper/escort talent agency and a tow struck firm".

On March 3, 1991. Full-Patch member of the Satan's Choice, Brian Beaucage had spent the night devoted to drinking, hard drugs and watching pornography in a Toronto rooming house. On the same night, he was beheaded in his bed by a member of the Loners, Frank Passarelli, with his body not found until the next day, being partially devoured by the dogs belonging to another boarder. At the time, the police expressed no surprise about Beaucage's murder, saying he was a violent and disagreeable man, and the only surprise was that it took this long for somebody to saw off his head with a kitchen knife. The gruesome nature of Beaucage's murder led it to take on a legendary reputation within biker circles, being known inaccurately as the "Fifty Whacks with an Ax". This incident saw a significant increase in the rivalry between the two clubs which would later spread into open conflict in 1995.

During the 1990s, Hells Angels from Quebec would frequently visit the Loners. In June 1993, the Hells Angels led by their national president Walter Stadnick hosted a party in Wasaga Beach that was attended by all of the Ontario biker gangs except the Outlaws and Satan's Choice. Lenti and the Loners were guests of honor at the party. Stadnick tried to persuade Lenti to have the Loners "patch over" to the Hells Angels, an offer Lenti and Raso refused. However, a working relationship was established between the two groups for a time with the Loners agreeing to buy their narcotics from the Angels. The Hells Angels offered Lenti and Raso further chances to "patch over" several times in 1993 and 1994, but they declined, with Lenti instead offering Stadnick a chance to join the Loners.

War with Satan's Choice
Frank Lenti would later be expelled from the Loners for the second time in 1994, which is said to either be due to allegations of him stealing from the club or the fact that his temper was apparently getting out of control. Upon being expelled from the Loners, Lenti would go on to found a new outlaw motorcycle club, the Diablos, which would later go to war with the Loners in the summer of 1995, supported by the Satan's Choice. Lenti located the clubhouse of Diablos only a half block away from the Loners' clubhouse on Kipling Avenue in Woodbridge, which was considered a provocation. The Diablos were courted by Satan's Choice, as the competition for the control of the drug trade in the Toronto area had grown very intense, and even the small territory controlled by the Diablos made them worth courting.  Satan's Choice agreed to sell drugs to the Diablos and offered the possibility of joining Satan's Choice, which angered the Loners, who were buying their narcotics from the Hells Angels. The Loners came into conflict with the Diablos in the summer of 1995, who called upon Satan's Choice for help. On 18 July 1995, a Diablo threw a homemade bomb at a tow truck owned by a Loner. A Loner shot two Diablos, through neither was seriously injured. I

On 1 August 1995, the Toronto clubhouse of Satan's Choice – which was backing the Diablos – was hit by a rocket fired from a rocket launcher. On 16 August 1995, Satan's Choice struck back by firing a rocket – again from a military rocket launcher – at the Loners' Woodbridge clubhouse. A Loner told the media it was not Satan's Choice that fired the rocket as he claimed: "Looks like the cops have stolen our rocket launcher". Despite the lurid headlines in the newspapers, Satan's Choice and Loners were not committed to an all-out struggle against the other, and Lorne Campbell made an agreement with the Loners and Satan's Choice that all of York Region north of Highway 7 was a "no war zone". On 25 August 1995, Lenti, the leader of the Diablos, was nearly killed by a bomb planted in his car which left him in a hospital for months. The Diablos collapsed without Lenti, after the deaths of two members they were absorbed by the Loners. The York Regional Police (YRP) and the Ontario Provincial Police (OPP) raided the Loners' Woodbridge clubhouse where they found a few weapons, but were unable to make any arrests. With the Diablos Motorcycle club gone, by the end of 1995 the Loners and Satan's Choice had agreed to peaceful terms.

Split and growth
In early 1997, the Loners split into two factions, 
one led by club founder Jimmy Raso and another by Frank Grano. The pro-Angel faction led by Grano, consisting of 20 members, joined the pro-Angel Para-Dice Riders, who would join the Hells Angels in 2000. While the anti-Angel faction led by Raso, which maintained the majority of the club's members, retained the Loners name and continue to expand the club. Stadnick cut off the supply of narcotics to the remaining Loners, this caused a temporary decline forcing the club to seek alternative sources of supply for their narcotics, eventually coming to a deal with the Outlaws motorcycle club. In 1999, the Loners' secretary Glenn "Wrongway" Atkinson and another Loner Wayne Connor was sent to Ireland to try persuade the Irish Alliance to join the Loners, an offer that was refused.

Ontario Biker War

From 1999 to 2002, the club was a participant in the Ontario Biker War. In June 1999, the London/St. Thomas chapter(based in Iona Station near London) of the Annihilators Motorcycle Club led by Wayne Kellestine was absorbed by the Loners. This merging of the Annihilators along with other clubs into the Loners was done in an attempt to increase the clubs membership to deal with the incoming threat of the Hells Angels. One Loner, Irish immigrant Glenn "Wrongway" Atkinson, was heard to remark after meeting Kellestine for the first time: "Can you believe the type of people we're attracting?" Unlike most Canadian outlaw bikers who were barely literate, Atkinson was a bibliophile who especially loved the work of James Joyce, which led the other bikers to consider him strange. Atkinson was well regarded as a diplomat, and often went back to Ireland to try unsuccessfully to persuade Irish outlaw biker clubs, loosely united under the banner of the Irish Alliance, to join the Loners. Atkinson told Edwards that there were many parallels between the world of Irish politics and Canadian outlaw biking, and to grow up following Irish politics was the best preparation for Canadian outlaw biking. Atkinson stated that both Canadian outlaw biking and Irish politics were based on a sense of identity formed around a sense of rebellion, fierce clannish loyalties and a professed strongly held moral code, while at the same time being inhabited by strange, cartoonish men given to making outlandish statements who frequently engaged in sordid intrigue and betrayed their friends, as greed and ambition outweighed their professed moral code.

One of the members of the St. Thomas/London chapter of the Loners, Jimmy Coates, had a brother, John Coates, who was a member of the Hells Angels' Sherbrooke chapter. John Coates was a 6'7 man who weighted 300 pounds while younger brother Jimmy was not as large, but still intimidating. Through his brother, Jimmy Coates opened a secret pipeline for buying drugs from Sherbrooke. The president of the London/St. Thomas chapter(their clubhouse was actually located in Iona station), Wayne Kellestine, was adamantly against having the Loners join the Hells Angels and once pistol-whipped one Loner who expressed a desire to join the Angels. Together, the Coates brothers worked to encourage a mutiny against Kellestine with the promise of joining the Angels as the reward. On 22 October 1999, an assassination attempt was made against Kellestine as he stopped in his truck for a red light in his hometown of Iona Station. A car driven by Philippe "Philbilly" Gastonguay of the Angels' Sherbrooke chapter together with a pro-Angel Loner, David "Dirty" McLeish, drove up and one of the two men in the car opened fire, spraying Kellestine's truck with bullets.

In December 2000, the Hells Angels entered Ontario by "patching over" a number of Ontario biker gangs. A number of Loners chose to join the Angels. Jimmy Coates became the first president of the Angels' London probationary chapter in 2001. Most of the others members in the London chapter were, like Coates, former Loners. The Woodbridge chapter of the Loners continued to operate as the Mother chapter. In February 2001, Edward Winterhalder of the Bandidos visited Woodbridge to discuss having the Loners join the Bandidos, an offer that was declined by the chapter president Pietro Barilla. By contrast, only the London chapter of the Loners joined the Bandidos in May 2001 (formerly known as the Chatham Loners before moving their clubhouse to St. Thomas and the nearby hamlet of Iona Station near London).

Over the past decade at the club has recovered and has made significant increases in growth and membership, its current influence is the strongest it has ever been with the club possessing chapters in several countries around the world, in the 2000 the club formed an alliance with fellow International Canadian Motorcycle Club the Rock Machine which is honoured into the modern day. The Loners Motorcycle Club is a group of motorcycle enthusiasts that are not involved in organized crime, any members that choose to commit these acts do so without the permission of the club.

Conflict with the Vagos

The Vagos Motorcycle Club, which is one of the largest motorcycle clubs in America, attempted to expand North into Canada in 2007. Their plan was to set up their first chapter in Toronto, Ontario but the chapter fell apart before it really got going. By October 2012, the Vagos Motorcycle Club established a new Canadian chapter in Peterborough, Ontario. The Loners Motorcycle Club had possessed a chapter in Peterborough for sometime causing some territorial tension, a split in the Loners Peterborough chapter during mid 2012, led to a defection of at least four of its members to the newly formed Vagos, this caused several altercations between the two groups. Including the defectors, an unnamed spokesperson told The Peterborough Examiner that the chapter is at least 23 full patch members and four prospects strong. They had acquired a clubhouse on the corner of Park Street and Perry Street(285 Perry St), which was in close proximity to the Loners clubhouse located at 126 Park Street.

In July 2012, a 47-year-old member of the Loners Motorcycle Club was sent to hospital with a broken arm after being attacked by several former Loners, who we're now affiliated with the Vagos. The incident occurred on Park Street, near a set of railroad tracks just down the road from the Loners Peterborough clubhouse, Peterborough authorities arrested four individuals in connection with the incident, three of whom we're previous members of the Loners, now in “bad standing” with the club. Garry Coppins, Chris Graham and Pierre Aragon, all former Loners were hit with multitude of charges including, assault, assault with a weapon, endangering the public, aggravated assault and uttering threats. A former Loners hangaround, Shane Gardiner was also charged with aggravated assault. The local authorities announced they would be keeping an eye on the situation and expressed their concern, saying that outlaw biker activity in the area is common but having two clubs in the same city that are not on good terms always has the possibility to spiral into a much larger conflict.

In late August, the Vagos clubhouse located on the corner of Park and Perry Streets, was firebombed by Molotov cocktails causing minor damage. A current Vagos member, Bob Pammett's property was also subject to arson, however little damage was caused to his truck as it seems the Molotov cocktail missed. Police were not able to confirm who was responsible for the arsons, but they assumed it was the Loners based on the ongoing issues between the groups. Staff Sgt. Larry Charmley stated:"Pammett’s crew and the Loners haven’t resolved their differences in the past few months." Police seized the remains of the cocktail and are still investigating. By late October, the Loners Peterborough chapter had increased it's strength. By absorbing the local Vigilantes Motorcycle Club, which had acted as their support club, this was done in a patch over ceremony that happened in September 2012. This increased the chapters numbers to over 30 members, giving them a significant advantage over the Vagos.

Chapters/charters worldwide

Canada (16)
World-wide/National
LMC International Nomads chapter
LMC Canada Nomads chapter
Alberta
LMC Edmonton chapter
LMC Edmonton North chapter (Frozen)
Nova Scotia
LMC Fredericton chapter
Ontario
LMC Woodbridge chapter (Mother chapter)
LMC Amherstburg chapter
LMC Richmond Hill chapter
LMC Stratford chapter
LMC Hamilton chapter
LMC Peterborough chapter 
LMC Windsor chapter
LMC Brockville chapter
LMC Toronto chapter (2020)
LMC Halton Hills chapter (2020) 
LMC Cornwall chapter (Frozen)
LMC Lindsay chapter (Frozen)
LMC London chapter (Frozen)
LMC Vaughan chapter (Frozen)
LMC Chatham chapter (Frozen)
Quebec
LMC Montreal chapter (Frozen)
Saskatchewan
LMC Saskatoon chapter
LMC Swift Current chapter
LMC Regina chapter (Frozen)

International/continental (2)
World-wide (1)
Loners MC International Nomads
Europe (1)
Loners MC European Nomads chapter

Other chapters (33)
Australia (1)
LMC Australia chapter (Sydney)
LMC Australia chapter (Melbourne)
Belgium (1)
LMC Belgium chapter (Brussels)
England (2)
LMC England chapter (London)
LMC England Nomads chapter
France (5)
LMC Auxonne chapter (Côte d'Or) & Support Ditry Dosen chapter
LMC Dole chapter (Jura)
LMC Lons le Saunier chapter (Jura)
LMC Saint Claude chapter (Jura)
LMC France Nomads chapter
Germany (2)
LMC Germany chapter (Berlin)
LMC Germany Nomads chapter
Italy (11)
LMC Verona chapter
LMC Massa chapter
LMC Bologna chapter
LMC Firenze chapter
LMC Messina chapter 
LMC Salerno chapter 
LMC Reggio chapter 
LMC Calabria chapter 
LMC Avellino chapter 
LMC Isernia chapter 
LMC Nomads Italy
LMC Naples chapter (Frozen)
LMC Brolo chapter (Frozen)
Netherlands (1)
LMC Holland chapter (Rotterdam)
New Zealand (1)
LMC New Zealand chapter (Wellington)
Portugal
LMC Portugal chapter (Frozen)
Spain (1)
LMC Spain chapter (Barcelona)
United States (8)
LMC Las Vegas chapter
LMC Colorado chapter
LMC Washington chapter
LMC Oregon chapter
LMC Michigan chapter
LMC Wyoming chapter 
LMC Idaho chapter
LMC Nomads USA
LMC Georgia chapter (Frozen)
LMC New York chapter (Frozen)
LMC Texas chapter (Frozen)

Criminal allegations and incidents 
Note: See Early History and War with Satan's Choice above for older incidents

Canada
The Loners Vaughan chapter clubhouse near Toronto, Ontario was raided by law enforcement in 1998, where authorities uncovered a pet African lion named "Woody" being kept in a tidy 25-metre by 25-metre pen. As a result, the club was charged with violating a King Township bylaw against keeping exotic pets.

On 18 April 2013, Police performed 12 pre-dawn raids in the York Region, Toronto and Caledon, where drugs and an assault rifle were seized. Marijuana packaged for distribution and thousands of Oxycodone, Percodan and morphine pills were seized. Four full-patch members of the Loners and nine other associates were charged, but some were later acquitted when the search warrants were dismissed by judges in 2016. In mid 2016 co-founder of the Loners MC, Gennaro "Jim" Raso, was charged with threatening death and discharging a firearm recklessly. The 15 charges were dropped in 2017.

Also in August 2016. A member of the Loners, Micheal Raso, Gennaro Raso's son, was allegedly involved in a drive-by shooting of the residence of Chief Financial Officer for the Dream Corporation(multi-million dollar Caribbean-based casino company), Ed Kremblewski, who was a minor witness in the attempted murder case against Antonio Carbone, who was a majority shareholder in Dream Corp. Carbone was an entrepreneur from Toronto that was involved in the casino business along with his brother, he was also found guilty of firebombing a rival's Jaguar on December 1, 2014. The vehicle belonged to Dream Casino manager Fernando Baez, and Antonio stated "Dream was estimated at $540 million so we're talking about the largest … conspiracy in the Dominican Republic."

Both brothers had been involved in a "series of lawsuits and countersuits revolving around the ownership and control of the company." Accusing them of attempting to defraud the Carbones brothers of their assets since the beginning of the partnership, Antonio was arrested on attempted murder in January 2015, he was imprisoned in the Dominican Republic and waited for his trial for two years. In total, Antonio was being sued in Canada for defrauding an investor of around $100 million, in the Dominican he was charged with stock manipulation and attempted murder.

In mid 2016, before Antonio's conviction it was alleged that Francesco Carbone had hired the Loners Motorcycle Club to put pressure on the witnesses and members of Dream Corp. Bullets were fired at Ed Kremblewski's home while his family was present, during the same time he and his sons were receiving "threatening phone calls". Kremblewski launched a civil lawsuit against Gennaro Raso, president of the Loners, his son Michael and Francesco Carbone, the brother of Antonio. Kremblewski claims that he and his family faced "threats of maiming and death" if the charges against Antonio were not dropped and that his "son would be shot in the head, his daughter would be maimed and killed and that his elderly parents would be assaulted and killed".

The lawsuit states, that the brothers had been using the Loners chapter in the Dominican to contact one another, Kremblewski also alleges that Francesco Carbone was behind the intimidation campaign carried out by the Loners MC and that Francesco Carbone even provided $18,000 in Canadian currency to Michael Raso to bribe a Dominican judicial official in an attempt to have his brother Antonio released on bail.  The claims in the lawsuit against the Raso's and Francesco Carbone remain unproven.

From early 2018 until 2020, the Cornwall chapter of the Loners MC had been operating an unmarked clubhouse in Cornwall, Ontario, just off of Montreal Road. It is alleged here that the group was involved in drug trafficking. Ontario Provincial Police launched an investigation against the Loners Motorcycle Club. After months of using various tactics that included sting operations, the investigation culminated in a raid on clubhouse located on Prince Arthur Street in Cornwall. A large amount of drugs were seized from the property, including purple fentanyl.

In February 2021, a Full-Patch member of the Loners Richmond Hill chapter was killed in an assumed narcotics deal gone wrong. In mid 2021, Toronto Police announced that they had raided a business associated with the Loners Toronto chapter. This resulted in the arrests of 5 members of the Loners Motorcycle Club and the confiscation of 258 grams of cocaine and $20,000 in cash.

On April 1, 2022. Ottawa Police arrested a member of the Loners "Nomads Canada" chapter. Authorities seized 60 grams of cocaine along with a "significant amount" of oxycodone tablets, psilocybin. They also confiscated two ballistic bullet proof vests, a semi auto .22-calibre rifle, a 9-mm rifle with a modified barrel, several magazines, ammunition and more than $1,800 in Canadian and American currencies. Police had also temporarily confiscated the "cuts" of Loners MC Nomads chapter belonging to the individual that was arrested and a Dirty Dozen MC "cut", which is one of the Loners support clubs in Canada.

United States
In 2019, several chapters of the USA Loners offered support and protection to protestors during the George Floyd riots.

In December 2020, three members of the Loners Wyoming chapter (Rock Springs), were arrested in connection with an assault that occurred outside of the Loners clubhouse in April of the same year.

In August 2022 a member of the Loners Motorcycle Club was arrested in Grants Pass Oregon for a hold out of Colorado and weapons charges he was later released from jail due to charges being dropped for lack of evidence and Colorado decided not to transport him, the Members name was David W Fritts (Cutter1%er) out of Tennessee

References

Bibliography
 

Organizations established in 1979
1979 establishments in Ontario
Outlaw motorcycle clubs
Motorcycle clubs in Canada
Gangs in Ontario